The 1986 Houston Astros season was the 25th season for the Major League Baseball (MLB) franchise in Houston, Texas. For the second time in team history, the Astros won the National League West division; it was their third postseason appearance the past seven seasons, and it would be their last for eleven years.

Offseason
 November 13, 1985: Mike Richardt was released by the Astros.

Regular season
 Kevin Bass had a 20-game hit streak during the season.
 Dave Smith set a club record with 33 saves in one season.
 September 23, 1986: Jim Deshaies set a record for the most strikeouts to start a game. Deshaies started the game with 8 strikeouts versus the Los Angeles Dodgers
 September 25, 1986: Mike Scott threw a no-hitter against the San Francisco Giants to help the Astros win the National League West. The final score was 2–0 and Scott struck out 13 Giants batters.
Scott was the first pitcher in the National League and the second overall to throw a no-hitter to clinch a pennant. The first was New York Yankees pitcher Allie Reynolds, who accomplished the feat on September 18, 1951.

Opening Day starters
 Mark Bailey
 Kevin Bass
 Eric Bullock
 Glenn Davis
 Bill Doran
 Nolan Ryan
 Dickie Thon
 Tony Walker
 Denny Walling

All-Star Game
The 1986 Major League Baseball All-Star Game was the 57th playing of the midsummer classic between the all-stars of the American League (AL) and National League (NL), the two leagues comprising Major League Baseball. The game was held on July 15, 1986, at the Astrodome in Houston, Texas, the home of the Astros. The game resulted in the American League defeating the National League 3–2.

Season standings

Record vs. opponents

Notable transactions
 June 2, 1986: 1986 Major League Baseball draft
Ryan Bowen was drafted by the Astros in the 1st round.
Karl Rhodes was drafted by the Astros in the 3rd round. Player signed June 10, 1986.
Trenidad Hubbard was drafted by the Astros in the 12th round of the 1986 amateur draft. Player signed June 16, 1986.
 Ed Whited was drafted by the Houston Astros in the 18th round of the 1986 amateur draft. 
Eric Anthony was drafted by the Astros in the 34th round. Player signed June 7, 1986.
 June 30, 1986: Matt Keough was signed as a free agent by the Astros.

Roster

Game log

Regular season

|-style="background:#fcc;"
| 1 || April 8 || 7:35p.m. CST || Giants || L 3–8 || Krukow (1–0) || Ryan (0–1) || Davis (1) || 2:20 || 22,935 || 0–1 || L1
|-style="background:#fcc;"
| 2 || April 9 || 7:35p.m. CST || Giants || L 1–4 || Garrelts (1–0) || Scott (0–1) || Minton (1) || 2:33 || 6,875 || 0–2 || L2
|-style="background:#cfc;" 
| 3 || April 10 || 7:35p.m. CST || Giants || W 4–0 || Knepper (1–0) || Blue (0–1) || — || 2:27 || 6,070 || 1–2 || W1
|-style="background:#cfc;" 
| 4 || April 11 || 7:35p.m. CST || Braves || W 2–1 || Kerfeld (1–0) || Palmer (0–1) || Smith (1) || 2:14 || 9,357 || 2–2 || W2
|-style="background:#cfc;" 
| 5 || April 12 || 7:35p.m. CST || Braves || W 4–3 || Ryan (1–1) || Mahler (1–1) || Smith (2) || 2:30 || 19,803 || 3–2 || W3
|-style="background:#fcc;"
| 6 || April 13 || 2:05p.m. CST || Braves || L 7–8 || Johnson (1–0) || Scott (0–2) || Garber (1) || 2:56 || 8,739 || 3–3 || L1
|-style="background:#cfc;"
| 7 || April 15 || 3:05p.m. CST || @ Giants || W 8–3 || Knepper (2–0) || Blue (0–2) || Kerfeld (1) || 3:01 || 46,638 || 4–3 || W1
|-style="background:#cfc;"
| 8 || April 16 || 2:05p.m. CST || @ Giants || W 4–1 || Ryan (2–1) || Mason (0–1) || Smith (3) || 2:45 || 3,590 || 5–3 || W2
|-style="background:#cfc;"
| 9 || April 18 || 6:35p.m. CST || @ Reds || W 6–4 || Scott (1–2) || Soto (1–1) || Smith (4) || 2:38 || 26,126 || 6–3 || W1
|-style="background:#cfc;"
| 10 || April 19 || 1:15p.m. CST || @ Reds || W 4–3 || Knepper (3–0) || Browning (0–1) || Smith (5) || 2:26 || 17,564 || 7–3 || W2
|-style="background:#cfc;"
| 11 || April 20 || 1:15p.m. CST || @ Reds || W 6–4 || adden (1–0) || Gullickson (0–1) || Kerfeld (2) || 2:45 || 17,878 || 8–3 || W3
|-style="background:#fcc;"
| 12 || April 21 || 6:40p.m. CST || @ Braves || L 2–8 || Johnson (2–0) || Ryan (2–2) || — || 2:36 || 5,361 || 8–4 || L1
|-style="background:#cfc;" 
| 13 || April 22 || 6:40p.m. CST || @ Braves || W 4–3 || Kerfeld (2–0) || Ward (0–1) || — || 2:18 || 6,316 || 9–4 || W1
|-style="background:#cfc;" 
| 14 || April 23 || 4:40p.m. CST || @ Braves || W 3–2 || Solano (1–0) || Smith (1–1) || Smith (6) || 2:27 || 7,666 || 10–4 || W2
|-style="background:#fcc;"
| 15 || April 24 || 7:35p.m. CST || Reds || L 0–3 || Soto (2–1) || Madden (1–1) || — || 2:35 || 10,245 || 10–5 || L1
|-style="background:#cfc;" 
| 16 || April 25 || 7:35p.m. CST || Reds || W 3–1 || Ryan (3–2) || Browning (0–2) || — || 2:07 || 16,296 || 11–5 || W1
|-style="background:#cfc;" 
| 17 || April 26 || 7:35p.m. CST || Reds || W 1–0 || Scott (2–2) || Gullickson (0–2) || — || 2:06 || 38,442 || 12–5 || W2
|-style="background:#cfc;"
| 18 || April 27 || 2:05p.m. CDT || Reds || W 6–0 || Knepper (4–0) || Denny (1–2) || — || 2:06 || 12,185 || 13–5 || W3
|-style="background:#fcc;"
| 19 || April 29 || 6:35p.m. CDT || @ Phillies || L 4–12 || Rawley (3–1) || Ryan (3–3) || — || 2:48 || 16,313 || 13–6 || L1
|-style="background:#cfc;"
| 20 || April 30 || 6:35p.m. CDT || @ Phillies || W 1–0 || Scott (3–2) || Gross (1–3) || Smith (7) || 2:38 || 17,134 || 14–6 || W1
|-

|-style="background:#cfc;"
| 21 || May 2 || 2:35p.m. CDT || @ Expos || W 6–3 || Knepper (5–0) || Youmans (0–3) || Smith (8) || 2:38 || 6,781 || 15–6 || W2
|-style="background:#fcc;" 
| 22 || May 3 || 12:35p.m. CDT || @ Expos || L 6–7  || Reardon (3–2) || DiPino (0–1) || — || 3:45 || 11,769 || 15–7 || L1
|-style="background:#fcc;"
| 23 || May 4 || 2:05p.m. CDT || @ Expos || L 6–7 || Reardon (4–2) || Smith (0–1) || — || 3:01 || 13,810 || 15–8 || L2
|-style="background:#fcc;" 
| 24 || May 6 || 6:35p.m. CDT || @ Mets || L 0–4 || Gooden (5–0) || Knepper (5–1) || — || 2:36 || 41,722 || 15–9 || L3
|-style="background:#fcc;"
| 25 || May 7 || 6:35p.m. CDT || @ Mets || L 2–3 || Fernandez (4–0) || Ryan (3–4) || Orosco (6) || 2:42 || 26,956 || 15–10 || L4
|-style="background:#cfc;" 
| 26 || May 9 || 6:35p.m. CDT || @ Pirates || W 3–2 || Kerfeld (3–0) || Winn (1–1) || Smith (9) || 2:27 || 17,296 || 16–10 || W1
|-style="background:#cfc;" 
| 27 || May 10 || 6:05p.m. CDT || @ Pirates || W 6–3 || Knepper (6–1) || Rhoden (2–2) || DiPino (1) || 2:56 || 13,344 || 17–10 || W2
|-style="background:#fcc;"
| 28 || May 11 || 12:35p.m. CDT || @ Pirates || L 3–4  || DeLeón (1–0) || Kerfeld (3–1) || — || 3:39 || 13,170 || 17–11 || L1
|-style="background:#fcc;" 
| 29 || May 12 || 7:35p.m. CDT || Phillies || L 1–5 || Rawley (4–3) || Deshaies (0–1) || — || 2:18 || 8,354 || 17–12 || L1
|-style="background:#cfc;" 
| 30 || May 13 || 7:35p.m. CDT || Phillies || W 3–2  || Solano (2–0) || Rucker (0–1) || — || 2:51 || 7,087 || 18–12 || W1
|-style="background:#cfc;"
| 31 || May 14 || 7:35p.m. CDT || Mets || W 6–2 || Knepper (7–1) || Ojeda (5–1) || — || 2:23 || 11,626 || 19–12 || W2
|-style="background:#fcc;" 
| 32 || May 15 || 7:35p.m. CDT || Mets || L 2–6 || Darling (4–0) || Ryan (3–5) || — || 2:42 || 13,856 || 19–13 || L1
|-style="background:#cfc;" 
| 33 || May 16 || 7:35p.m. CDT || Cubs || W 9–6 || Solano (3–0) || Baller (1–2) || Smith (10) || 2:50 || 17,802 || 20–13 || W1
|-style="background:#cfc;" 
| 34 || May 17 || 7:35p.m. CDT || Cubs || W 5–1 || Scott (4–2) || Trout (2–1) || — || 2:40 || 37,483 || 21–13 || W2
|-style="background:#fcc;"
| 35 || May 18 || 2:05p.m. CDT || Cubs || L 2–5 || Hoffman (1–1) || Knepper (7–2) || Smith (5) || 3:02 || 14,483 || 21–14 || L1
|-style="background:#fcc;"
| 36 || May 20 || 7:35p.m. CDT || Pirates || L 2–4 || Walk (2–0) || Ryan (3–6) || — || 2:38 || 8,711 || 21–15 || L2
|-style="background:#fcc;"
| 37 || May 21 || 7:35p.m. CDT || Pirates || L 1–2 || Rhoden (3–3) || Scott (4–3) || — || 2:22 || 6,990 || 21–16 || L3
|-style="background:#cfc;" 
| 38 || May 22 || 3:35p.m. CDT || Pirates || W 4–0 || Knepper (8–2) || Reuschel (3–4) || — || 2:29 || 4,784 || 22–16 || W1
|-style="background:#fcc;" 
| 39 || May 23 || 3:05p.m. CDT || @ Cubs || L 1–4 || Sutcliffe (2–6) || Solano (3–1) || — || 2:23 || 20,532 || 22–17 || L1
|-style="background:#fcc;"
| 40 || May 24 || 12:20p.m. CDT || @ Cubs || L 3–4 || Frazier (2–3) || Smith (0–2) || Smith (6) || 2:50 || 33,355 || 22–18 || L2
|-style="background:#cfc;"
| 41 || May 25 || 1:20p.m. CDT || @ Cubs || W 3–1  || Kerfeld (4–1) || Smith (0–2) || Smith (11) || 3:02 || 36,000 || 23–18 || W1
|-style="background:#cfc;"
| 42 || May 26 || 5:35p.m. CDT || @ Cardinals || W 4–1 || Deshaies (1–1) || Forsch (3–3) || DiPino (2) || 2:43 || 20,099 || 24–18 || W2
|-style="background:#cfc;"
| 43 || May 27 || 7:35p.m. CDT || @ Cardinals || W 5–4 || Smith (1–2) || Dayley (0–3) || — || 2:48 || 20,146 || 25–18 || W3
|-style="background:#cfc;"
| 44 || May 28 || 12:35p.m. CDT || @ Cardinals || W 4–3  || Kerfeld (5–1) || Worrell (3–3) || — || 3:18 || 17,582 || 26–18 || W4
|-style="background:#fcc;"
| 45 || May 30 || 7:35p.m. CDT || Expos || L 0–1 || Smith (4–4) || Scott (4–4) || Reardon (12) || 2:14 || 13,854 || 26–19 || L1
|-style="background:#cfc;" 
| 46 || May 31 || 7:35p.m. CDT || Expos || W 4–3 || DiPino (1–1) || Burke (2–1) || Smith (12) || 2:30 || 25,831 || 27–19 || W1
|-

|-style="background:#cfc;"
| 47 || June 1 || 2:05p.m. CDT || Expos || W 8–4 || Knepper (9–2) || Hesketh (3–4) || — || 2:38 || 13,325 || 28–19 || W2
|-style="background:#fcc;"
| 48 || June 2 || 7:35p.m. CDT || Cardinals || L 2–9 || Tudor (5–3) || Madden (1–2) || — || 2:45 || 11,669 || 28–20 || L1
|-style="background:#fcc;"
| 49 || June 3 || 7:35p.m. CDT || Cardinals || L 1–3 || Mathews (1–0) || Deshaies (1–2) || Worrell (8) || 2:20 || 6,430 || 28–21 || L2
|-style="background:#cfc;"
| 50 || June 4 || 7:35p.m. CDT || Cardinals || W 4–2 || Scott (5–4) || Burris (2–2) || Smith (13) || 2:33 || 11,396 || 29–21 || W1
|-style="background:#fcc;"
| 51 || June 5 || 9:35p.m. CDT || @ Dodgers || L 0–1 || Honeycutt (3–3) || Hernández (0–1) || Howell (3) || 2:25 || 32,545 || 29–22 || L1
|-style="background:#fcc;"
| 52 || June 6 || 9:35p.m. CDT || @ Dodgers || L 2–3 || Howell (2–2) || Knepper (9–3) || — || 2:52 || 38,991 || 29–23 || L2
|-style="background:#cfc;"
| 53 || June 7 || 2:20p.m. CDT || @ Dodgers || W 7–5 || López (1–0) || Howell (2–3) || Smith (14) || 3:27 || 32,902 || 30–23 || W1
|-style="background:#cfc;"
| 54 || June 8 || 3:05p.m. CDT || @ Dodgers || W 3–2 || Scott (6–4) || Valenzuela (8–4) || Smith (15) || 2:44 || 47,404 || 31–23 || W2
|-style="background:#cfc;" 
| 55 || June 9 || 9:05p.m. CDT || @ Padres || W 5–3 || Deshaies (2–2) || Show (3–4) || López (1) || 2:42 || 19,167 || 32–23 || W3
|-style="background:#cfc;"
| 56 || June 10 || 9:05p.m. CDT || @ Padres || W 12–1 || Knepper (10–3) || Dravecky (5–6) || — || 2:31 || 13,966 || 33–23 || W4
|-style="background:#fcc;"
| 57 || June 11 || 3:05p.m. CDT || @ Padres || L 7–11 || McCullers (2–1) || DiPino (1–2) || — || 2:47 || 13,686 || 33–24 || L1
|-style="background:#cfc;"
| 58 || June 12 || 7:35p.m. CDT || Giants || W 4–1 || Hernández (1–1) || Krukow (8–4) || Smith (16) || 2:37 || 16,342 || 34–24 || W1
|-style="background:#fcc;"
| 59 || June 13 || 7:35p.m. CDT || Giants || L 1–3 || Davis (2–3) || Scott (6–5) || — || 2:22 || 23,352 || 34–25 || L1
|-style="background:#cfc;" 
| 60 || June 14 || 7:35p.m. CDT || Giants || W 7–3 || Deshaies (3–2) || Mulholland (0–1) || López (2) || 2:48 || 32,477 || 35–25 || W1
|-style="background:#fcc;"
| 61 || June 15 || 2:05p.m. CDT || Giants || L 2–7 || Blue (4–3) || Knepper (10–4) || — || 2:56 || 22,958 || 35–26 || L1
|-style="background:#fcc;" 
| 62 || June 17 || 6:35p.m. CDT || @ Reds || L 4–5 || Welsh (2–1) || Hernández (1–2) || Franco (11) || 2:33 || 16,824 || 35–27 || L2
|-style="background:#fcc;" 
| 63 || June 18 || 6:35p.m. CDT || @ Reds || L 2–3 || Robinson (5–0) || Smith (1–3) || — || 2:20 || 17,426 || 35–28 || L3
|-style="background:#cfc;"
| 64 || June 19 || 6:35p.m. CDT || @ Reds || W 6–2 || Deshaies (4–2) || Soto (3–7) || — || 2:54 || 25,920 || 36–28 || W1
|-style="background:#fcc;"
| 65 || June 20 || 10:05p.m. CDT || @ Giants || 1–3 || Blue (5–3) || Knepper (10–5) || Berenguer (2) || 2:18 || 25,116 || 36–29 || L1
|-style="background:#fcc;"
| 66 || June 21 || 3:05p.m. CDT || @ Giants || 1–2 || Garrelts (6–6) || Knudson (0–1) || Berenguer (3) || 2:51 || 24,927 || 36–30 || L2
|-style="background:#fcc;"
| 67  || June 22 || 2:05p.m. CDT || @ Giants || 2–4 || Krukow (9–4) || Hernández (1–3) || — || 2:22 || N/A || 36–31 || L3
|-style="background:#fcc;"
| 68  || June 22 || 5:02p.m. CDT || @ Giants || 2–3 || Berenguer (1–0) || Smith (1–4) || Hensley (1) || 2:42 || 47,030 || 36–32 || L4
|-style="background:#cfc;"
| 69 || June 23 || 7:35p.m. CDT || Reds || W 7–6 || Anderson (1–0) || Power (3–5) || — || 2:57 || 12,953 || 37–32 || W1
|-style="background:#cfc;" 
| 70 || June 24 || 7:35p.m. CDT || Reds || W 8–4 || Ryan (4–6) || Browning (5–7) || — || 2:44 || 17,487 || 38–32 || W2
|-style="background:#fcc;"
| 71 || June 25 || 7:35p.m. CDT || Reds || L 3–4  || Franco (1–4) || López (1–1) || — || 3:00 || 13,313 || 38–33 || L1
|-style="background:#cfc;"
| 72 || June 27 || 7:35p.m. CDT || Dodgers || W 5–0 || Scott (7–5) || Reuss (2–6) || — || 2:06 || 25,760 || 39–33 || W1
|-style="background:#cfc;"
| 73 || June 28 || 7:35p.m. CDT || Dodgers || W 6–4 || Deshaies (5–2) || Welch (3–6) || Aurelio López (3) || 2:35 || 34,252 || 40–33 || W2
|-style="background:#cfc;"
| 74 || June 29 || 2:05p.m. CDT || Dodgers || W 2–1 || Hernández (2–3) || Valenzuela (10–5) || DiPino (3) || 2:23 || 32,723 || 41–33 || W3
|-style="background:#fcc;"
| 75 || June 30 || 7:35p.m. CDT || Padres || L 2–9 || Dravecky (7–7) || Knepper (10–6) || — || 2:22 || 11,141 || 41–34 || L1
|-

|-style="background:#fcc;"
| 76 || July 1 || 7:35p.m. CDT || Padres || L 4–7 || Show (7–4) || Knudson (0–2) || Gossage (14) || 2:46 || 13,866 || 41–35 || L2
|-style="background:#cfc;" 
| 77 || July 2 || 7:35p.m. CDT || Padres || W 8–1 || Scott (8–5) || Hawkins (5–5) || — || 2:18 || 10,148 || 42–35 || W1
|-style="background:#fcc;" 
| 78 || July 3 || 6:35p.m. CDT || @ Mets || L 5–6  || Orosco (4–4) || DiPino (1–3) || — || 3:08 || 48,839 || 42–36 || L1
|-style="background:#fcc;" 
| 79 || July 4 || 12:35p.m. CDT || @ Mets || L 1–2 || Gooden (10–3) || Smith (1–5) || — || 2:39 || 28,557 || 42–37 || L2
|-style="background:#cfc;" 
| 80 || July 5 || 6:05p.m. CDT || @ Mets || W 2–1 || Kerfeld (6–1) || McDowell (7–1) || — || 2:24 || 50,939 || 43–37 || W1
|-style="background:#fcc;"
| 81 || July 6 || 12:35p.m. CDT || @ Mets || L 3–5 || Fernandez (11–2) || Knudson (0–3) || McDowell (8) || 3:08 || 31,017 || 43–38 || L1
|-style="background:#cfc;"
| 82 || July 7 || 6:35p.m. CDT || @ Expos || W 12–1 || Scott (9–5) || Martínez (0–1) || — || 2:40 || 17,694 || 44–38 || W1
|-style="background:#cfc;"
| 83 || July 8 || 6:35p.m. CDT || @ Expos || W 4–1 || Ryan (5–6) || Tibbs (4–5) || Kerfeld (3) || 2:29 || 16,382 || 45–38 || W2
|-style="background:#fcc;"
| 84 || July 9 || 6:05p.m. CDT || @ Expos || L 1–2 || Youmans (9–5) || Knepper (10–7) || — || 2:08 || 15,316 || 45–39 || L1
|-style="background:#cfc;"
| 85 || July 10 || 7:35p.m. CDT || Phillies || W 11–4 || Knudson (1–3) || Hudson (4–9) || — || 2:39 || 18,289 || 46–39 || W1
|-style="background:#fcc;"
| 86 || July 11 || 7:35p.m. CDT || Phillies || L 1–4 || Carman (4–2) || Scott (9–6) || Bedrosian (11) || 2:22 || 18,047 || 46–40 || L1
|-style="background:#cfc;"
| 87 || July 12 || 12:50p.m. CDT || Phillies || W 4–3 || Ryan (6–6) || Rawley (11–5) || Smith (17) || 2:51 || 17,491 || 47–40 || W1
|-style="background:#fcc;"
| 88 || July 13 || 2:05p.m. CDT || Phillies || L 4–5  || Bedrosian (6–3) || Smith (1–6) || — || 3:01 || 20,597 || 47–41 || L1
|- style="text-align:center; background:#bbcaff;"
| colspan="12" | 57th All-Star Game in Houston, Texas
|-style="background:#fcc;"
| 89 || July 17 || 7:35p.m. CDT || Mets || L 2–13 || Ojeda (11–2) || Ryan (6–7) || — || 3:10 || 21,536 || 47–42 || L2
|-style="background:#cfc;"
| 90 || July 18 || 7:35p.m. CDT || Mets || W 3–0 || Knepper (11–7) || Darling (9–3) || — || 2:25 || 22,906 || 48–42 || W1
|-style="background:#cfc;"
| 91 || July 19 || 7:35p.m. CDT || Mets || W 5–4 || Smith (2–6) || McDowell (7–3) || — || 2:38 || 44,502 || 49–42 || W2
|-style="background:#cfc;"
| 92 || July 20 || 2:05p.m. CDT || Mets || W 9–8  || Knepper (12–7) || McDowell (7–4) || — || 5:29 || 23,900 || 50–42 || W3
|-style="background:#cfc;"
| 93 || July 21 || 7:35p.m. CDT || Expos || W 8–7 || Kerfeld (7–1) || Reardon (6–5) || — || 3:03 || 13,753 || 51–42 || W4
|-style="background:#cfc;"
| 94 || July 22 || 7:35p.m. CDT || Expos || W 1–0  || Smith (3–6) || Youmans (10–6) || — || 2:43 || 19,271 || 52–42 || W5
|-style="background:#cfc;"
| 95 || July 23 || 7:35p.m. CDT || Expos || W 4–3  || López (2–1) || Burke (7–4) || — || 3:07 || 15,364 || 53–42 || W6
|-style="background:#cfc;"
| 96 || July 24 || 6:35p.m. CDT || @ Phillies || W 9–3 || Scott (10–6) || Rawley (11–7) || — || 2:37 || 31,094 || 54–42 || W7
|-style="background:#fcc;" 
| 97 || July 25 || 6:35p.m. CDT || @ Phillies || L 2–4 || Hudson (6–9) || Deshaies (5–3) || Bedrosian (13) || 2:28 || 23,387 || 54–43 || L1
|-style="background:#fcc;"
| 98 || July 26 || 6:05p.m. CDT || @ Phillies || L 2–3 || Carman (5–2) || Knudson (1–4) || Schatzeder (2) || 2:24 || 34,075 || 54–44 || L2
|-style="background:#cfc;"
| 99 || July 27 || 12:35p.m. CDT || @ Phillies || W 3–2 || Ryan (7–7) || Gross (6–8) || López (4) || 2:14 || 33,192 || 55–44 || W1
|-style="background:#cfc;"
| 100 || July 28 || 7:35p.m. CDT || Braves || W 4–2 || Knepper (13–7) || Alexander (6–7) || Smith (18) || 2:19 || 24,597 || 56–44 || W2
|-style="background:#fcc;" 
| 101 || July 29 || 7:35p.m. CDT || Braves || L 0–1 || Palmer (7–8) || Scott (10–7) || Garber (13) || 2:31 || 26,610 || 56–45 || L1
|-style="background:#cfc;"
| 102 || July 30 || 7:35p.m. CDT || Braves || W 4–2 || Deshaies (6–3) || Acker (3–5) || Smith (19) || 2:50 || 34,102 || 57–45 || W3
|-

|-style="background:#cfc;" 
| 103 || August 1 || 9:05p.m. CDT || @ Padres || W 6–3 || Knepper (14–7) || Hoyt (5–7) || Smith (20) || 2:39 || 22,108 || 58–45 || W2
|-style="background:#cfc;"
| 104 || August 2 || 9:05p.m. CDT || @ Padres || W 5–4 || Scott (11–7) || Show (7–5) || Smith (21) || 2:40 || 28,612 || 59–45 || W3
|-style="background:#fcc;" 
| 105 || August 3 || 3:05p.m. CDT || @ Padres || L 1–5 || Hawkins (8–7) || Knudson (1–5) || Gossage (18) || 2:20 || 21,850 || 59–46 || L1
|-style="background:#fcc;"
| 106 || August 4 || 7:05p.m. CDT || @ Dodgers || L 3–7 || Valenzuela (15–6) || Kerfeld (7–2) || — || 2:54 || 32,182 || 59–47 || L2
|-style="background:#cfc;"
| 107 || August 5 || 9:35p.m. CDT || @ Dodgers || W 10–2 || López (3–1) || Howell (4–7) || Smith (22) || 3:21 || 45,525 || 60–47 || W1
|-style="background:#fcc;"
| 108 || August 6 || 3:05p.m. CDT || @ Dodgers || L 4–7 || Honeycutt (8–6) || Keough (2–3) || Neidenfuer (7) || 3:06 || 40,709 || 60–48 || L1
|-style="background:#cfc;"
| 109 || August 8 || 7:35p.m. CDT || Padres || W 5–0 || Scott (12–7) || McCullers (5–6) || — || 2:15 || 31,142 || 61–48 || W1
|-style="background:#cfc;" 
| 110 || August 9 || 7:35p.m. CDT || Padres || W 6–2 || Deshaies (7–3) || Hawkins (8–8) || Kerfeld (4) || 2:28 || 38,169 || 62–48 || W2
|-style="background:#fcc;"
| 111 || August 10 || 2:05p.m. CDT || Padres || L 3–5 || Dravecky (8–9) || Knepper (14–8) || Gossage (19) || 2:30 || 20,839 || 62–49 || L1
|-style="background:#cfc;" 
| 112 || August 11 || 7:05p.m. CDT || Dodgers || W 7–6 || Smith (4–6) || Howell (4–8) || — || 3:31 || 23,206 || 63–49 || W1
|-style="background:#cfc;"
| 113 || August 12 || 7:35p.m. CDT || Dodgers || W 3–0 || Ryan (8–7) || Honeycutt (8–7) || Kerfeld (5) || 2:25 || 37,973 || 64–49 || W2
|-style="background:#fcc;" 
| 114 || August 13 || 7:35p.m. CDT || Dodgers || L 3–5 || Hershiser (12–8) || Scott (12–8) || Niedenfuer (8) || 2:40 || 33,327 || 64–50 || L1
|-style="background:#cfc;"
| 115 || August 14 || 7:35p.m. CDT || Dodgers || W 3–2 || Andersen (2–0) || Valenzuela (15–8) || Smith (23) || 2:15 || 42,118 || 65–50 || W1
|-style="background:#cfc;"
| 116 || August 15 || 6:40p.m. CDT || @ Braves || W 3–0 || Knepper (15–8) || Acker (4–6) || — || 2:14 || 26,625 || 66–50 || W2
|-style="background:#cfc;" 
| 117 || August 16 || 6:40p.m. CDT || @ Braves || W 7–4 || Keough (3–3) || Mahler (11–12) || Smith (24) || 2:43 || 31,862 || 67–50 || W3
|-style="background:#fcc;" 
| 118 || August 17 || 1:10p.m. CDT || @ Braves || L 3–4 || Speck (2–0) || Andersen (2–1) || Garber (18) || 2:54 || 17,618 || 67–51 || L1
|-style="background:#cfc;"
| 119 || August 18 || 6:35p.m. CDT || @ Pirates || W 3–0 || Scott (13–8) || Walk (5–7) || — || 2:24 || 7,965 || 68–51 || W1
|-style="background:#cfc;"
| 120 || August 19 || 6:35p.m. CDT || @ Pirates || W 1–0 || Deshaies (8–3) || Bielecki (6–9) || Smith (25) || 2:31 || 9,128 || 69–51 || W2
|-style="background:#fcc;" 
| 121 || August 20 || 6:35p.m. CDT || @ Pirates || L 1–4 || Rhoden (14–7) || Knepper (15–9) || — || 2:12 || 16,997 || 69–52 || L1
|-style="background:#fcc;" 
| 122 || August 22 || 7:35p.m. CDT || @ Cardinals || L 5–6 || Tudor (13–6) || Ryan (8–8) || Worrell (28) || 2:44 || 33,918 || 69–53 || L2
|-style="background:#fcc;" 
| 123 || August 23 || 7:05p.m. CDT || @ Cardinals || L 1–7 || Cox (8–10) || Scott (13–9) || — || 2:28 || 40,944 || 69–54 || L3
|-style="background:#cfc;"
| 124 || August 24 || 1:15p.m. CDT || @ Cardinals || W 5–1 || Deshaies (9–3) || Conroy (3–8) || López (5) || 2:50 || 33,687 || 70–54 || W1
|-style="background:#cfc;"
| 125 || August 25 || 7:35p.m. CDT || Cubs || W 3–2 || Kerfeld (8–2) || Smith (8–8) || Smith (26) || 2:40 || 24,211 || 71–54 || W2
|-style="background:#fcc;" 
| 126 || August 26 || 7:35p.m. CDT || Cubs || L 3–5 || Lynch (4–3) || Darwin (6–9) || Smith (25) || 2:33 || 22,579 || 71–55 || L1
|- style="text-align:center; background:#cfc 
| 127 || August 27 || 7:35p.m. CDT || Cubs || W 7–1 || Ryan (9–8) || oyer (5–4) || Kerfeld (6) || 2:39 || 24,198 || 72–55 || W1
|- style="text-align:center; background:#cfc 
| 128 || August 29 || 7:35p.m. CDT || Pirates || W 3–2 || Scott (14–9) || Reuschel (8–15) || Smith (27) || 2:37 || 22,801 || 73–55 || W2
|-style="background:#fcc;" 
| 129 || August 30 || 7:35p.m. CDT || Pirates || L 3–13 || Rhoden (15–7) || Deshaies (9–4) || — || 2:46 || 30,598 || 73–56 || L1
|-style="background:#fcc;" 
| 130 || August 31 || 2:05p.m. CDT || Pirates || L 2–8 || Walk (7–7) || Knepper (15–10) || — || 2:17 || 25,405 || 73–57 || L2
|-

|-style="background:#cfc;"
| 131 || September 1 || 1:20p.m. CDT || @ Cubs || W 6–4 || Darwin (7–9) || Lynch (4–4) || Smith (28) || 3:01 || 25,547 || 74–57 || W1
|-style="background:#cfc;" 
| 132 || September 2 || 3:05p.m. CDT || @ Cubs || W 8–7  || Darwin (8–9) || Maddux (0–1) || — || 5:14 || 10,501 || 75–57 || W2
|-style="background:#cfc;" 
| 133 || September 3 || 1:20p.m. CDT || @ Cubs || W 8–2 || Scott (15–9) || Sanderson (7–11) || — || 2:48 || 7,051 || 76–57 || W3
|-style="background:#fcc;"
| 134 || September 5 || 7:35p.m. CDT || Cardinals || L 5–8 || Soff (2–0) || López (3–2) || — || 2:50 || 23,547 || 76–58 || L1
|-style="background:#cfc;"
| 135 || September 6 || 7:35p.m. CDT || Cardinals || W 7–6 || Kerfeld (9–2) || Worrell (8–10) || — || 2:58 || 21,802 || 77–58 || W1
|-style="background:#cfc;"
| 136 || September 7 || 2:05p.m. CDT || Cardinals || W 6–3 || Calhoun (1–0) || Mathews (10–5) || Smith (29) || 2:50 || 20,773 || 78–58 || W2
|-style="background:#cfc;"
| 137 || September 8 || 7:35p.m. CDT || Reds || W 3–1 || Ryan (10–8) || Welsh (5–6) || Kerfeld (7) || 2:26 || 26,997 || 79–58 || W3
|-style="background:#cfc;" 
| 138 || September 9 || 7:35p.m. CDT || Reds || W 9–2 || Scott (16–9) || Browning (12–12) || — || 2:11 || 22,711 || 80–58 || W4
|-style="background:#fcc;" 
| 139 || September 10 || 9:35p.m. CDT || @ Dodgers || L 1–5 || Hershiser (13–10) || Deshaies (9–5) || — || 2:56 || 27,534 || 80–59 || L1
|-style="background:#fcc;" 
| 140 || September 11 || 9:35p.m. CDT || @ Dodgers || L 6–14 || Valenzuela (19–9) || Knepper (15–11) || — || 2:51 || 34,816 || 80–60 || L2
|-style="background:#cfc;"
| 141 || September 12 || 9:05p.m. CDT || @ Padres || W 5–3 || Kerfeld (10–2) || McCullers (8–8) || Smith (30) || 2:35 || 11,319 || 81–60 || W1
|-style="background:#fcc;" 
| 142 || September 13 || 9:05p.m. CDT || @ Padres || L 3–4 || Lefferts (8–7) || Smith (4–7) || — || 2:42 || 32,729 || 81–61 || L1
|-style="background:#fcc;"
| 143 || September 14 || 3:05p.m. CDT || @ Padres || L 2–3 || Lefferts (9–7) || Scott (16–10) || — || 2:35 || 13,279 || 81–62 || L2
|-style="background:#cfc;" 
| 144 || September 16 || 6:35p.m. CDT || @ Reds || W 6–1 || Knepper (16–11) || Gullickson (13–11) || Andersen (1) || 2:34 || 16,927 || 82–62 || W1
|-style="background:#cfc;" 
| 145 || September 17 || 6:35p.m. CDT || @ Reds || W 6–1 || Darwin (9–9) || Welsh (6–7) || — || 2:26 || 15,195 || 83–62 || W2
|-style="background:#cfc;"
| 146 || September 18 || 11:35a.m. CDT || @ Reds || W 5–3 || Keough (4–3) || Browning (13–13) || López (6) || 2:16 || 11,825 || 84–62 || W3
|-style="background:#cfc;" 
| 147 || September 19 || 7:35p.m. CDT || Padres || W 5–4 || Kerfeld (11–2) || LaPoint (4–9) || Smith (31) || 2:47 || 23,805 || 85–62 || W4
|-style="background:#cfc;" 
| 148 || September 20 || 7:35p.m. CDT || Padres || W 10–6 || Scott (17–10) || Hayward (0–1) || — || 2:33 || 36,878 || 86–62 || W5
|-style="background:#fcc;"
| 149 || September 21 || 2:05p.m. CDT || Padres || L 0–5 || Jones (1–0) || Knepper (16–12) || — || 2:24 || 23,385 || 86–63 || L1
|-style="background:#fcc;"
| 150 || September 22 || 7:35p.m. CDT || Dodgers || L 2–9 || Valenzuela (20–10) || Darwin (9–10) || — || 2:35 || 27,641 || 86–64 || L2
|-style="background:#cfc;"
| 151 || September 23 || 7:35p.m. CDT || Dodgers || W 4–0 || Deshaies (10–5) || Powell (2–7) || — || 2:44 || 27,734 || 87–64 || W1
|-style="background:#cfc;"
| 152 || September 24 || 7:35p.m. CDT || Giants || W 6–0 || Ryan (11–8) || LaCoss (10–13) || — || 2:39 || 37,611 || 88–64 || W2
|-style="background:#cfc;"
| 153 || September 25 || 3:35p.m. CDT || Giants || W 2–0 || Scott (18–10) || Berenguer (2–3) || — || 2:24 || 32,808 || 89–64 || W3
|-style="background:#fcc;" 
| 154 || September 26 || 6:40p.m. CDT || @ Braves || L 4–5 || Alexander (11–10) || Keough (4–4) || Smith (1) || 2:15 || 6,754 || 89–65 || L1
|-style="background:#cfc;"
| 155 || September 27 || 1:20p.m. CDT || @ Braves || W 4–0 || Darwin (10–10) || Palmer (11–10) || — || 2:22 || 13,545 || 90–65 || W1
|-style="background:#cfc;" 
| 156 || September 28 || 1:10p.m. CDT || @ Braves || W 2–0 || Deshaies (11–5) || Acker (5–11) || Smith (32) || 2:22 || 6,280 || 91–65 || W2
|-style="background:#fcc;"
| 157 || September 30 || 9:35p.m. CDT || @ Giants || L 5–6 || Davis (5–7) || López (3–3) || — || 2:34 || 13,358 || 91–66 || L1
|-

|-style="background:#cfc;"
| 158 || October 1 || 2:05p.m. CDT || @ Giants || W 5–0 || Darwin (11–10) || Krukow (19–9) || — || 2:41 || 9,881 || 92–66 || W1
|-style="background:#cfc;"
| 159 || October 2 || 3:05p.m. CDT || @ Giants || W 2–1 || Keough (5–4) || Robinson (6–3) || Smith (33) || 3:07 || 8,656 || 93–66 || W2
|-style="background:#cfc;"  
| 160 || October 3 || 7:35p.m. CDT || Braves || W 6–2 || Ryan (12–8) || Acker (5–12) || — || 2:22 || 25,068 || 94–66 || W3
|-style="background:#cfc;"
| 161 || October 4 || 1:20p.m. CDT || Braves || W 3–2 || Deshaies (12–5) || Smith (8–16) || López (7) || 2:18 || 17,314 || 95–66 || W4
|-style="background:#cfc;"
| 162 || October 5 || 2:05p.m. CDT || Braves || W 4–1 || Knepper (17–12) || ahler (14–18) || — || 1:50 || 37,531 || 96–66 || W5
|-

|- style="text-align:center;"
| Legend:       = Win       = Loss       = PostponementBold = Astros team member

Postseason Game log

|-style="background:#cfc;"
| 1 || October 8 || 7:25p.m. CDT || Mets || W 1–0 || Scott (1–0) || Gooden (0–1) || – || 2:56 || 44,131 || HOU 1–0 || W1
|-style="background:#fcc;"
| 2 || October 9 || 7:20p.m. CDT || Mets || L 1–5 || Ojeda (1–0) || Ryan (0–1) || – || 2:40 || 44,391 || Tied 1–1 || L1
|-style="background:#fcc;"
| 3 || October 11 || 11:10a.m. CDT || @ Mets || L 5–6 || Orosco (1–0) || Smith (0–1) || – || 2:55 || 55,052 || NYM 2–1 || L2
|-style="background:#cfc;"
| 4 || October 12 || 7:20p.m. CDT || @ Mets || W 3–1 || Scott (2–0) || Fernandez (0–1) || – || 2:23 || 55,038 || Tied 2–2 || W1
|-style="background:#bbb;"
|–|| October 13 || || @ Mets || colspan=8 | Postponed (Rain) (Makeup date: October 14)
|-style="background:#fcc;"
| 5 || October 14 || 12:05p.m. CDT || @ Mets || L 1–2  || Orosco (2–0) || Kerfeld (0–1) || – || 3:45 || 54,986 || NYM 3–2 || L1
|-style="background:#fcc;"
| 6 || October 15 || 2:05p.m. CDT || Mets || L 5–6  || Orosco (3–0) || López (0–1) || – || 4:42 || 45,718 || NYM 4–2 || L2
|-

|- style="text-align:center;"
| Legend:       = Win       = Loss       = PostponementBold = Astros team member

Player stats

Batting

Starters by position
Note: Pos = Position; G = Games played; AB = At bats; H = Hits; Avg. = Batting average; HR = Home runs; RBI = Runs batted in

Other batters
Note: G = Games played; AB = At bats; H = Hits; Avg. = Batting average; HR = Home runs; RBI = Runs batted in

Pitching

Starting pitchers 
Note: G = Games pitched; IP = Innings pitched; W = Wins; L = Losses; ERA = Earned run average; SO = Strikeouts

Other pitchers 
Note: G = Games pitched; IP = Innings pitched; W = Wins; L = Losses; ERA = Earned run average; SO = Strikeouts

Relief pitchers 
Note: G = Games pitched; IP = Innings pitched; W = Wins; L = Losses; SV = Saves; ERA = Earned run average; SO = Strikeouts

National League Championship Series

Game 1
October 8 (Astrodome, Houston, Texas)

Game 2
October 9 (Astrodome, Houston, Texas)

Game 3
October 11 (Shea Stadium, Flushing, New York)

Game 4
October 12 (Shea Stadium, Flushing, New York)

Game 5
October 14 (Shea Stadium, Flushing, New York)

Game 6
October 15 (Astrodome, Houston, Texas)

Game 6 was one for the ages, in more ways than one. The game went 16 innings with the Mets coming out on top 7–6. It was the highest scoring game of the series; in fact, the 16th inning alone featured more runs than three of the previous five games had in their entirety.

The Astrodome hosted what some consider to be one of the greatest games of all time that October and it will forever be remembered.

The big story of Game 6 was that it was most nearly a must-win for both teams. The Astros obviously had to have it because they were facing elimination. Even though they were up 3–2 in the series, the Mets regarded it as a must-win because they were scheduled to face Mike Scott again in Game 7. Scott had given up a grand total of 1 run in his first two starts of the series, and had dominated the Mets so completely that even the most optimistic Mets fans knew their chances of beating him in a potential Game 7 were small. The end result was one of the greatest games in baseball history.

The Astros broke through first, and for a low scoring series like this, they broke through big, scoring three runs off a possibly tired Bob Ojeda in the bottom of the first. He settled down after that, however, and the Astros wouldn't score again for the next 12 innings. Meanwhile, Astros starter Bob Knepper was brilliant from the very first pitch, and the game headed to the 9th still 3–0.

Just when it looked like the Mets would have to face the mighty Scott, however, their bats suddenly came to life. After pitching almost perfectly for the first eight innings, Knepper clearly tired in the 9th. He allowed three hits and recorded only one out, and left with the Astros clinging to a 3–2 lead. The decision by Lanier not to bring in Smith to start the inning was talked about for years to come. Smith was their closer, but had blown a save earlier in the series. When Smith finally did appear, he was ineffective, walking two batters to load the bases and then allowing the tying run to score on a sacrifice fly by Ray Knight. In a matter of minutes, the previously raucous crowd of 45,718 had been almost completely silenced and extra innings had soon begun.

In the 14th, the Mets made their first bid to win. After Gary Carter opened with a single, a walk to Darryl Strawberry put two runners on with nobody out. After Knight forced Carter at third, Wally Backman drove a single to right. When Kevin Bass' throw to the plate sailed high over Alan Ashby's head to the screen, Strawberry scored. It looked like the end for the Astros, as Orosco came in to close them down.

With one out in the bottom of the 14th and the Houston fans with their heads in their hands, Billy Hatcher shocked everyone with a line drive home run off the left field foul pole. It was the first earned run allowed by the Mets bullpen in the entire series. Hatcher went 3 for 7 in the game, and his homer meant the Astros would be kept alive for at least one more inning. Both teams failed to score in the 15th, and the game went to the 16th inning, the most innings in playoff history at that time.

The 16th inning would be the deciding factor, and it was not an easy 16th for either pitching staff. The Mets appeared to take control of the game once again, this time coming up with 3 runs in the top half of the inning. The rally began with Strawberry receiving a gift double when Billy Hatcher and Bill Doran misplayed his towering fly ball with one out. When Knight followed with a single to right, a poor throw to the plate by Kevin Bass allowed the tiebreaking run to score, just as it had in the 14th. A walk, two wild pitches, and a single by Lenny Dykstra brought in two more runs, putting the Mets up 7–4. This sent some of the Houston faithful for the exits; those who stayed, however, almost witnessed the unthinkable.

Orosco struck out Craig Reynolds to open the inning, but a walk and two singles later, Houston had a run in and the tying run on base. Orosco induced Denny Walling to hit into a force play at second for the second out, but Glenn Davis singled home another run, bringing the Astros within a run. People everywhere were quiet as they watched Orosco face right fielder Kevin Bass with two outs and the tying run on second, and the winning run on first.

It was all up to Bass to drive in a run and tie the game. Orosco threw Bass six straight sliders; when Bass swung and missed the last of them, the epic series was over. Orosco was awarded the victory, marking the first time in postseason history a reliever won three games in a series. It would be a long winter for the Astros, but for the Mets, an even bigger trial awaited them. After taking two days off to recover from the exhausting series against Houston, the Mets began a legendary World Series against the Boston Red Sox, a series in which they would pull off one of the greatest comebacks of all time.

The Mets had won the series with a .189 batting average, the lowest average recorded by a winning team in a postseason series. Their pitching had been the key.

Awards and honors
 Kevin Bass – National League Player of the Month, June
  Mike Scott – National League Leader ERA Champion (2.22)
  Mike Scott – National League Leader in Innings Pitched (275.1)
  Mike Scott – National League Leader in Shutouts (5)
  Mike Scott – National League Leader in Strikeouts (306)
  Mike Scott – NLCS Most Valuable Player
 Mike Scott – The Sporting News Pitcher of the Year, National League
 Mike Scott – Cy Young Award, National League
 Hal Lanier – National League Manager of the Year
 Hal Lanier, Associated Press Manager of the Year
All-Star Game
  Kevin Bass, outfield, reserve
  Glenn Davis, first baseman, reserve
  Mike Scott, starting pitcher, reserve
  Dave Smith, relief pitcher, reserve

Farm system 

LEAGUE CHAMPIONS: Columbus

References

External links
1986 Houston Astros at Baseball Reference
1986 Astros team at baseball-almanac.com

Houston Astros seasons
Houston Astros season
National League West champion seasons
Houston